Helmuth Schönnenbeck (1902-1973) was a German film editor and producer. He edited the 1941 film Goodbye, Franziska. He was married to Anneliese Schönnenbeck, who was also a film editor.

Selected filmography

Editor
 Escape in the Dark (1939)
 Marriage in Small Doses (1939)
 Target in the Clouds (1939)
 Men Are That Way (1939)
 Hurrah! I'm a Father (1939)
 Goodbye, Franziska (1941)
 We Make Music (1942)
 Front Theatre (1942)
 Sophienlund (1943)
 Quax in Africa (1947)

Producer
 And If We Should Meet Again (1947)
 Love on Ice (1950)
 Salto Mortale (1953)

Screenwriter
 Blocked Signals (1948)

References

Bibliography 
 Jacobsen, Wolfgang & Prinzler, Hans Helmut. Käutner. Spiess, 1992.

External links 
 

1902 births
1973 deaths
Film people from Bavaria